The Lichfield rail crash was a rail crash which occurred on New Year's Day 1946 at Lichfield Trent Valley station in Staffordshire, England. 20 people were killed in the accident, caused when a points failure routed a goods train into the back of a stationary passenger train waiting at the station. This event, alongside the Abbots Ripton rail accident, is the basis for the story The Flying Kipper in the Railway Series by Rev. W. Awdry.

The crash
At Lichfield Trent Valley station there were four tracks running through the station: two fast through lines in each direction with loops on each side for trains stopping at the station.

The crash occurred at 18:58, and involved the 14:50 fish train from Fleetwood to London Broad Street. This train consisted of seven four-wheel fish vans and a brake van hauled by a Stanier Class 5 4-6-0. It was travelling at around 35 mph when it passed into the station, and was scheduled to run through on the fast up line. The goods train was diverted onto the platform loop where it collided with the rear end of the local passenger train. The passenger train consisted of four old wooden-bodied coaches; the force of the impact demolished the rear three coaches, and hurled the engine (a LNWR Prince of Wales Class 4-6-0) forwards 100 yards.

Casualties
20 passengers on the passenger train lost their lives – 13 in the collision and the remainder either in hospital or on the way there. Another 21 were injured, some seriously, including a porter on the platform who was injured by flying debris. The crew of the passenger train were unhurt, however the crew of the goods train suffered bruises and minor injuries, and the driver had to be treated for severe shock.

Cause
The points failure was caused by the extremely cold weather that day freezing the point mechanisms. When the signalman had accepted the fish train from the previous signalbox to the North, he needed to swing the facing points (that allowed entry into the Up Platform Loop from the Up line) from reverse to normal. Unbeknown to him, the points had frozen in reverse position. However, he was able to push the lever back into the frame and engage the point lock and thus clear the signal. He was able to do this because the point rods had become bent, allowing sufficient play for the lever to be pushed fully into the normal position, but actually leaving the points in reverse. This accident is one of the very rare occasions where mechanical interlocking has failed to work correctly.

Sources

Ministry of Transport official report

External links
Pathe Newsreel report of the accident

Railway accidents and incidents in Staffordshire
Railway accidents in 1946
1946 in England
Accidents and incidents involving London, Midland and Scottish Railway
History of Lichfield
20th century in Staffordshire
1946 disasters in the United Kingdom
January 1946 events in the United Kingdom
Train collisions in England